Queens of Panguru a New Zealand reality television mini series that airs on Māori Television. The show focuses on the personal lives of three cousins Jay Tewake, Ramon Te Wake and Maihi Makiha. The three who are well known in the LGBT community in Auckland, New Zealand return home to their small town of Panguru. Its premise originated with Mika X, who also serves as an executive producer. The series debuted on March 22, 2017 with only five episodes in the series. All three queens are related through notable tribe leader Heremia Te Wake, who is the father of respected kuia (Māori elder), Dame Whina Cooper.

The Queens

Jay Tewake

Jay Tewake (born 25 February 1990) is a New Zealand Māori actor, musician, model, film producer, entertainment manager and choreographer. He was well known at the time for his work with Mika Haka, Health TV series Ka TV & Ka Life and his performance at Mika's Aroha Mardi Gras in 2011.

Ramon Te wake

Ramon Te Wake (born 25 March 1976) is a New Zealand trans woman documentarian, singer-songwriter and television presenter. She is well known for her work in music with the release of her two albums The Arrival and Movement is Essential. She has appeared in multiple short films and television series including AROHA – K' Road Stories and Takataapui.

Maihi Makiha
Maihi Makiha is a well known New Zealand drag queen. They are also well known for their work at the New Zealand Aids Foundation as a Community Engagement Coordinator. They also performed at RWC Mika Aroha Mardi Gras in 2011 and has a regular spot on TV on the TVNZ show Whanau Living.

Episodes

References

External links
 

New Zealand reality television series
2017 New Zealand television series debuts
2017 New Zealand television series endings
New Zealand LGBT-related television shows
2010s LGBT-related reality television series